The 2002–03 Danish Cup was the 49th version of the Danish Cup. The final was played on May 29, 2003.

The cup winner qualified for UEFA Cup qualification.

Results
The team listed to the left, is the home team.

1st round
In first round competed 48 teams from the "series" (Denmark's series and lower 2001) and 16 teams from Danish 2nd Division 2001-02.

2nd round
In second round competed 32 winning teams from 1st round and 8 teams from Danish 1st Division 2001-02 (no. 9 to 16).

3rd round
In third round competed 20 winning teams from 2nd round, 6 teams from Danish 1st Division 2001-02 (no. 3 to 8) and 2 teams from Danish Superliga 2001-02 (no. 11 and 12).

4th round
In fourth round competed 14 winning teams from 3rd round, 2 teams from Danish 1st Division 2001-02 (no. 1 and 2) and 4 teams from Danish Superliga 2001-02 (no. 7 to 10).

5th round
In fifth round competed 10 winning teams from 4th round and 6 teams from Danish Superliga 2001-02 (no. 1 to 6).

Quarter finals

Semi finals
The semi finals are played on home and away basis.

Final
The final was played at Parken Stadium.

See also
 Football in Denmark
 Danish Superliga 2002-03
 Danish 1st Division 2002-03

External links
Danish Cup 2002-03 Results from DBU

Danish Cup
Cup
2003